The Battle of Islandbridge, also called the Battle of Áth Cliath, took place on 14 September 919, between a coalition of native Irish, led by Niall Glúndub, overking of the Northern Uí Néill and High King of Ireland, and the Dublin-based Vikings of the Uí Ímair, led by Sitric Cáech. It was one in a series of battles initiated by the native Irish to attempt to drive the Vikings of the Uí Ímair from Ireland. The battle was a decisive victory for Sitric Cáech and the Uí Ímair, with Niall Glúndub and five other Irish kings dying in the battle.

Background
The ruling Vikings of Dublin, the Uí Ímair, had been expelled from the city in 902 by a joint force led by Máel Finnia mac Flannacán, overking of Brega and Cerball mac Muirecáin, overking of Leinster. However, this expulsion was temporary and Viking raids continued on Irish settlements. In 914 a large Viking fleet sailed to the previously Viking-controlled city of Waterford, and the following year more Vikings settled in Limerick, though Dublin itself remained outside Uí Ímair control. In 917 two prominent members of the Uí Ímair, Ragnall and Sitric Cáech, grandsons of Ímar, sailed separate fleets to Ireland, Ragnall landing at Waterford and Sitric Cáech landing at Cenn Fuait in Leinster. Several native Irish kings gathered forces to try to drive off the Vikings once more, including Niall Glúndub, over-king of the Northern Uí Néill and High King of Ireland, and Augaire mac Ailella, over-king of Leinster. The Vikings fought and won a victory against Niall Glúndub and the men of the Uí Néill at the Battle of Mag Femen in Brega, and then won another victory against Augaire mac Ailella and the men of Leinster at Cenn Fuait. Sitric led his men on a triumphant return to Dublin, re-establishing Viking rule and installing himself as king, while Ragnall returned to England.

Battle
In 919 a number of Irish kings banded together to try to expel the Vikings from Dublin once more. The known kings who took part in this coalition were Niall Glúndub of the Northern Uí Néill, Áed mac Eochocáin of Ulster, Máel Mithig mac Flannacain of Brega, Mael Craibe mac Duibsinig of Airgíalla, Conchobar mac Flainn of Mide, and Cellach mac Fogartaig of South Brega. The historian Clare Downham has suggested that Niall Glundub and the other kings were emboldened by the departure of Ragnall from Ireland to try again to force out the Uí Ímair. The forces of Sitric and Niall met near Islandbridge in modern day County Dublin on the fourteenth of September. The Annals of the Four Masters describe Niall's words before the battle:

The battle was an overwhelming victory for the Vikings; Niall and five of his ally kings died in the battle alongside many other Irish nobles. The six slain kings were Niall Glúndub of the Northern Uí Néill, Áed mac Eochocáin of Ulster, Máel Mithig mac Flannacain of Brega, Mael Craibe mac Duibsinig of Airgíalla, Conchobar mac Flainn of Mide, and Cellach mac Fogartaig of South Brega. Other notable casualties include one of Niall Glúndub's kinsmen, a member of the ruling dynasty of the Southern Uí Néill, and Eiremón mac Cennétig, Chief of the Cenél Maine.

The failure of this coalition to drive out the Vikings ensured the hold of the Uí Ímair on Dublin remained strong. Nevertheless, war between the Vikings and the native Irish continued, and the following year there was a battle between the Vikings of Dublin and Donnchad Donn, the brother of the slain king Conchobar mac Flainn and the new High King of Ireland.

Notes

References

Citations

Primary sources
 
 
 
 
 
  Accessed via Internet Archive.
  Accessed via Internet Archive.

Secondary sources

External links
 CELT: Corpus of Electronic Texts at University College Cork. The Corpus of Electronic Texts includes the Annals of Ulster and the Four Masters, the Chronicon Scotorum and the Book of Leinster as well as Genealogies, and various Saints' Lives. Most are translated into English, or translations are in progress.

910s conflicts
Battles involving the Vikings
Battles involving the Uí Néill
History of County Dublin
Viking Age in Ireland